Bayanjargalan is the name of two sums (districts) in Mongolia:
 Bayanjargalan, Dundgovi
 Bayanjargalan, Töv